Dimitar Andonov was a Bulgarian officer and revolutionary, a leader of an Internal Macedonian-Adrianople Revolutionary Organization (IMARO) revolutionary band for the Prilep region.

Biography

Dimitar Andonov was born in 1871 in Stara Zagora, then part of the Ottoman Empire. He finished a military school for sergeants and served in the 12-th Infantry Balkan Battalion of the Bulgarian Army. On March 5, 1903, Dimitar Andonov, together with Nikola Valchev and Nestor Baykov, left the army. In Sofia, they connected with the foreign representation body of the revolutionary organization IMARO and in Kyustendil they joined the Prilep revolutionary band of Konstantin Kondov. Their fellow-townsman Georgi Staynov was already a member of this revolutionary band.

Part of Kostantin Kondov's revolutionary band entered into an ambush near the village of Toplica, as a result of which seven freedom fighters and the leader Nikola Bozhkov were killed. Dimitar Andonov and Nestor Baykov reorganized the band and managed to escape the ambush. Later, this section joined the revolutionary band of Petar Atsev. During the preparations of the Ilinden-Preobrazhenie Uprising, Dimitar Andonov was appointed head of the Prekoridski revolutionary region. He was responsible for the military training of the freedom fighters in this region.

During the uprising, Dimitar Andonov and Nestor Baykov fought two battles with the Ottoman Army near Dunje and Staravina and they organized the logistics for the transport of gunpowder and weaponry from Bitola to Prilep. They participated in the action led by Petar Atsev, in the village of Živovo, that was an unsuccessful attempt to take over the Ottoman garrison. They had other battles at the Nidže Mountain and the Farish Inns, in which they succeeded in disrupting the communication on the road between Prilep, Kavadarci and Krivolak. Gjorche Petrov refused their suggestion to attack the Ottoman garrisons in the town of Prilep.

At the end of the uprising, Dimitar Andonov returned in Bulgaria and again joined the military and served in his battalion. He participated in the Balkan Wars. During the First World War, on March 1, 1917, he was promoted to the rank of captain. On March 17, he died in the battle near Chervenata Stena (The Red Wall) against English and French battalions. On the occasion of his death, Petar Atsev wrote:

References

1871 births
1917 deaths
People from Stara Zagora
Members of the Internal Macedonian Revolutionary Organization
Bulgarian revolutionaries
Bulgarian military personnel of the Balkan Wars
Bulgarian military personnel of World War I
Bulgarian military personnel killed in World War I